Andrea Waldis (born 13 June 1994) is a Swiss racing cyclist. She rode in the women's omnium event at the 2018 UCI Track Cycling World Championships.

References

1994 births
Living people
Swiss female cyclists
Place of birth missing (living people)
Cyclists at the 2019 European Games
European Games competitors for Switzerland
21st-century Swiss women